Michael Finkel (born 1969) is a journalist and memoirist, who has written the books True Story: Murder, Memoir, Mea Culpa (2005) and The Stranger in the Woods: The Extraordinary Story of the Last True Hermit (2017).

Career
Finkel was a writer for The New York Times until 2002, when he was discovered to have used interviews with multiple people to create a composite protagonist, Youssouf Malé, for a story he had written on the Arabic slave trade within Africa, "Is Youssouf Malé A Slave?"

Finkel had originally pitched a child slavery story to The New York Times, but his subsequent reporting did not uncover proof of enslavement, although he did encounter teenagers working for meager wages in difficult conditions.

The story Finkel submitted purported to profile an adolescent West African boy, Youssouf Malé, who sold himself into slavery on a cocoa plantation in the Ivory Coast. The story as published included photographs, including one described as being that of Malé. After publication, an official of Save the Children contacted Finkel to say that the boy pictured was not Malé. Upon questioning by his editors, Finkel admitted that the boy profiled in the article was in fact a composite of several boys he had interviewed, including one named Youssouf Malé. Finkel was then fired.

After his dismissal from The New York Times, Finkel learned that Christian Longo, an Oregon man who had murdered his wife and three children in December 2001, had used "Michael Finkel" as an alias during his several weeks as a fugitive. After Longo's capture the next month, Finkel communicated with him. Finkel says that, before the trial, Longo had hoped the journalist would bring out "the real story" to help him win acquittal; after conviction, the convict gave Finkel interviews admitting his guilt. Finkel wrote a memoir on the relationship, True Story: Murder, Memoir, Mea Culpa (2005).

Finkel is also the author of The Stranger in the Woods which tells the story of Christopher Thomas Knight, a hermit who lived alone in woods in the North Pond area of Maine for 27 years.

Honors and awards
True Story was nominated for an Edgar Award for Best Fact Crime (2006). A film adaptation was released in April 2015, starring Jonah Hill as Finkel and James Franco as Longo.

In 2008, Finkel and photographer John Stanmeyer won the National Magazine Award for photojournalism for "Bedlam in the Blood: Malaria", published in  National Geographic (July 2007).

References 

Living people
The New York Times writers
American memoirists
American newspaper reporters and correspondents
Place of birth missing (living people)
Journalism ethics
Livingston Award winners for International Reporting
1968 births